Role Models is a 2008 American comedy film directed by David Wain, who co-wrote it with Timothy Dowling, Paul Rudd and Ken Marino. The film follows two energy drink salesmen who are ordered to perform 150 hours of community service as punishment for various offenses. For their service, the two men work at a program designed to pair children with adult role models. The film stars Seann William Scott, Paul Rudd, Christopher Mintz-Plasse, Bobb'e J. Thompson, Jane Lynch and Elizabeth Banks.

Plot
Danny and Wheeler are salesmen promoting the energy drink "Minotaur", supposedly to keep kids off drugs. Wheeler loves the job, while Danny considers it pointless and dead-end, making him depressed and jaded. Danny's uncouth behavior results in the collapse of his relationship with Beth, who breaks up with him after an impulsive proposal.

After a botched presentation at a high school, Danny and Wheeler's Minotaur truck is towed from the no-parking zone. Danny tries to free the truck, almost hitting a security guard then crashing into a statue. They are arrested and charged.

Beth makes a deal with the judge: they must do 150 hours of community service over the next 30 days, in lieu of 30 days in jail. Their service is with Sturdy Wings, a big brother-big sister program led by Gayle Sweeny, a recovering addict. She warns them that if they fail to meet her requirements they will be sent to prison. Wheeler is given Ronnie Shields, a vulgar young boy who has driven away all the other "Bigs" he has been paired with. Danny is assigned Augie Farks, a shy teen obsessed with a medieval LARPG  called "LAIRE" (Live Action Interactive Role-playing Explorers).

Danny does not find common ground with Augie, while Ronnie dislikes Wheeler. Danny considers giving up and choosing jail, but Wheeler talks him out of it. Gradually bonding with their "littles"; Ronnie and Wheeler talk about having been abandoned by their fathers, while Danny learns about Augie's medieval fantasy realm. Ronnie hears about Wheeler's favorite band, Kiss, and discovers that Wheeler shares his obsession with breasts, which Wheeler teaches him to control. Danny and Augie bond discovering they are both involved in the Sturdy Wings program against their will. Danny joins Augie's LAIRE and tries to get back with Beth, who insists "it is for the best".

However, their good luck is short-lived. When Augie sneaks up on the King of LAIRE, Argotron, the King lies and tells everyone that he killed Augie. Defending Augie, Danny confronts and shoves the King, getting them banned from LAIRE permanently. Later, Danny insults Augie's mother and her boyfriend for not supporting Augie, earning their hatred. As they kick Danny out of the house, Danny retorts, "I'd be psyched if he was my kid." Meanwhile, Wheeler takes Ronnie to a party, but leaves him unsupervised, resulting in Ronnie walking home alone. When both kids' parents ask Sturdy Wings for new mentors, Gayle expels Danny and Wheeler from the program, resulting in both men failing to complete their community service. Although Beth agrees to defend Danny and Wheeler in court, she warns them that they will most likely go to jail.

Danny convinces King Argotron to allow him and Augie to fight in the battle royale. Wheeler gets permission from Karen to hang out with Ronnie after he gets out of jail, and Ronnie forgives him. However, the King secretly warns the other members of Augie's LAIRE "country" of Xanthia that allowing Augie to fight with them will lead to severe retribution in the game. They call Augie to tell him he is a liability and out of the group. Danny and Augie form a new LAIRE country by asking Wheeler and Ronnie to join them. They arrive with Wheeler's Kiss costumes and a Kiss-themed Minotaur truck, naming their country "Kiss-My-Anthia". Augie finally defeats the king, but Sarah, a hidden player who goes by Esplen in LAIRE, attacks and defeats Augie; crowned the new queen, she chooses Augie as her king-consort. Augie's parents forgive Danny.

Impressed that Wheeler and Danny care for the children, Gayle clears their names with the judge. Danny serenades Beth with a rendition of the Kiss song "Beth" and they reconcile.

Cast

 Paul Rudd as Danny
 Seann William Scott as Wheeler 
 Christopher Mintz-Plasse as Augie
 Bobb'e J. Thompson as Ronnie
 Elizabeth Banks as Beth 
 Jane Lynch as Gayle
 Ken Jeong as King Argotron
 Kerri Kenney-Silver as Lynette
 Ken Marino as Jim
 Nicole Randall Johnson as Karen
 A.D. Miles as Martin Gary
 Joe Lo Truglio as Kuzzik
 Vincent Martella as Artonius
 Matt Walsh as Davith of Glencracken
 Allie Stamler as Sarah/Queen Esplen
 Jessica Morris as Linda the Teacher
 Carly Craig as Connie
 Keegan-Michael Key as Duane
 Amanda Righetti as Isabel
 Jorma Taccone as Mitch from Graphics
 Armen Weitzman as Party Dude
 Elijah Polanco as Ronnie's Friend
 Nate Hartley as Rule Master
 Louis C.K. as School Liaison

Production
The film was originally announced in December 2006 under the title Big Brothers, with Luke Greenfield directing and Timothy Dowling writing the script. A January 22, 2007, draft of the script credits Moses Port and David Guarascio as writers, with no listing of Dowling. During promotion for the film Knocked Up, Paul Rudd revealed that shooting on Big Brothers was on hiatus while the script was being retooled. News was later revealed that Rudd was commissioned to write a new draft of the script and David Wain had signed on to direct. Wain later revealed the film was now titled Little Big Men. UniversalPictures.com listed the film under the final title Role Models, which made its release on November 7, 2008. It was pre-screened at the University of Maryland's Hoff Theater on October 30, 2008, to positive accord.

A running gag in the film is a song entitled "Love Take Me Down (to the Streets)", which is claimed by Martin to be by the band Wings. In the initial scene at the Sturdy Wings building, Martin begins singing the song, which he claims is "one of their hits from the '70s", a fact which Danny denies. During the credits, the song plays and is listed on the film soundtrack as being performed by "Not Wings". The song was written by Charles Gansa, a composer who worked on the film, and A. D. Miles, who plays Martin in the film. It was written to imitate the style of the music of Wings and performed by Joey Curatolo, a Paul McCartney soundalike who performs in the Beatles tribute band Rain.

Release

Box office
Role Models opened #2 at the box office behind Madagascar: Escape 2 Africa with $19.2 million. The film made a total of $67,300,955 domestically and $25,201,210 in foreign countries, for a total of $92,502,165 worldwide.

Critical response
Role Models was met with generally positive reviews. On Rotten Tomatoes, the film has a rating of 77%, based on 162 reviews. The site's consensus reads, "Role Models is a frequently crude, always funny comedy with the cast providing solid work throughout." On Metacritic, the film holds a rating of 61 out of 100, based on 33 critics, indicating "generally positive reviews".

In their year end review, IGN awarded Role Models with "Best Comedy Film of 2008". Eye Weekly selected Role Models as one of the best films of 2008.

Home media
The DVD was released on March 10, 2009, selling 1,028,207 during its first week generating $17,469,237 in revenue. As of August 10, 2011 the DVD sold 2,555,713 copies and brought in over $40 million in revenue.

References

External links

 
 
 

2008 films
2000s buddy comedy films
American buddy comedy films
Films about friendship
Films directed by David Wain
Films produced by Scott Stuber
Films with screenplays by Paul Rudd
Relativity Media films
Universal Pictures films
2008 comedy films
2000s English-language films
2000s American films